Vladimir Popović (Cyrillic: Владимир Поповић; born 5 June 1976) is a Montenegrin former football midfielder.

Club career
He played for FK Budućnost Podgorica, FK Zemun, Sporting de Gijón, Málaga CF, Getafe CF, FK Železnik and FK Kom.

External links
 
La Liga career at LFP. 

1976 births
Living people
Footballers from Podgorica
Association football midfielders
Serbia and Montenegro footballers
Montenegrin footballers
FK Budućnost Podgorica players
FK Zemun players
Sporting de Gijón players
Málaga CF players
Getafe CF footballers
FK Železnik players
FK Kom players
First League of Serbia and Montenegro players
La Liga players
Montenegrin First League players
Serbia and Montenegro expatriate footballers
Expatriate footballers in Spain
Serbia and Montenegro expatriate sportspeople in Spain